The men's sanda (as Sanshou) 52 kg at the 2006 Asian Games in Doha, Qatar was held from 11 to 14 December at the Aspire Hall 3 in Aspire Zone.

A total of fifteen competitors from fifteen countries competed in this event, limited to fighters whose body weight was less than 52 kilograms.

Rene Catalan from the Philippines won the gold medal after beating Phan Quốc Vinh of Vietnam in gold medal bout 2–0.

Schedule
All times are Arabia Standard Time (UTC+03:00)

Results
Legend
AV — Absolute victory
KO — Won by knockout

References

Results

External links
Official website

Men's sanda 52 kg